The 38th Film Independent Spirit Awards, honoring the best independent films and television series of 2022, were presented by Film Independent on March 4, 2023. The film nominations were announced live via YouTube on November 22, 2022 by Raúl Castillo and Taylour Paige, while the television nominations were announced on December 13, 2022 by Asia Kate Dillon. Like last year, the ceremony was separated from its previous longtime berth on the day before the Academy Awards. Instead, there were eight days separating the ceremonies, with the 95th Academy Awards taking place on March 12, 2023. This ceremony occurred during the middle of final Oscar voting, taking place between March 2 and March 7, meaning the winners of this year's Independent Spirit Awards may have had an impact on Oscar voters.

For the first time since 1997, the ceremony wasn't broadcast live on the American basic cable channel IFC but instead streamed live on IMDb's YouTube channel, as well as both Film Independent's YouTube channel and Twitter. American comedian Hasan Minhaj hosted the ceremony.

The A24 absurdist comedy drama Everything Everywhere All at Once won a total of seven awards, including Best Feature, sweeping every category it was nominated for and winning the most awards for a single film in the history of the Independent Spirit Awards.

Changes
This year, gender-neutral categories were introduced. The organization has switched the traditionally separated male and female lead and supporting categories for film and television, and instead combined them with ten nominations each in two new categories: Best Lead Performance and Best Supporting Performance. The same has become true for the television categories with Best Lead Performance in a New Scripted Series as well as the newly added award for Best Supporting Performance in a New Scripted Series. Additionally, a retired film category was re-introduced: Best Breakthrough Performance; it was discontinued in 2005, but is limited to only five nominees. Film Independent has also increased the budget cap for eligible films to $30 million to account for the rising cost of production. Over the years, the budget cap has increased incrementally from $20 million in 2006 to $22.5 million in 2019. The budget cap for the Independent Spirit John Cassavetes Award, presented to a film's writer, director and producer, also increased from $500K to $1 million. In response to the continuing effects of COVID on filmmakers and the industry, Film Independent once again waived the theatrical run typically required for eligibility, ensuring more opportunities for independent filmmakers to be recognized and celebrated.

Winners and nominees

Film

Films with multiple nominations and awards

Television
{| class=wikitable style="width=100%"
|-
! style="width=50%" | Best New Scripted Series
! style="width=50%" | Best New Non-Scripted or Documentary Series
|-
| valign="top" |
The Bear (FX on Hulu) Pachinko (Apple TV+)
 The Porter (BET+ / CBC Television)
 Severance (Apple TV+)
 Station Eleven (HBO Max)
| valign="top" |The Rehearsal (HBO) Children of the Underground (FX)
 Mind Over Murder (HBO)
 Pepsi, Where's My Jet? (Netflix)
 We Need to Talk About Cosby (Showtime)
|-
! style="width=50%" | Best Lead Performance in a New Scripted Series
! style="width=50%" | Best Supporting Performance in a New Scripted Series
|-
| valign="top" |Quinta Brunson – Abbott Elementary as Janine Teagues (ABC) Aml Ameen – The Porter as Junior Massey (BET+ / CBC Television)
 Mohammed Amer – Mo as Mo Najjar (Netflix)
 Bridget Everett – Somebody Somewhere as Sam (HBO Max)
 KaMillion – Rap Sh!t as Mia Knight (HBO Max)
 Melanie Lynskey – Yellowjackets as Shauna Shipman (Showtime)
 Himesh Patel – Station Eleven as Jeevan Chaudhary (HBO Max)
 Sue Ann Pien – As We See It as Violet Wu (Prime Video)
 Ben Whishaw – This Is Going to Hurt as Adam Kay (AMC+ / BBC One)
| valign="top" |Ayo Edebiri – The Bear as Sydney Adamu (FX on Hulu) Danielle Deadwyler – Station Eleven as Miranda Carroll (HBO Max)
 Jeff Hiller – Somebody Somewhere as Joel (HBO Max)
 Gbemisola Ikumelo – A League of Their Own as Clance Morgan (Prime Video)
 Janelle James – Abbott Elementary as Ava Coleman (ABC)
 Ebon Moss-Bachrach – The Bear as Richard "Richie" Jerimovich (FX on Hulu)
 Frankie Quiñones – This Fool as Luis (Hulu)
 Sheryl Lee Ralph – Abbott Elementary as Barbara Howard (ABC)
 Molly Shannon – I Love That for You as Jackie Stilton (Showtime)
 Tramell Tillman – Severance as Seth Milchick (Apple TV+)
|-
! colspan="2" style="width=50%" | Best Ensemble Cast in a New Scripted Series
|-
| colspan="2" valign="top" |Pachinko – Soji Arai, Jin Ha, Inji Jeong, Minha Kim, Kaho Minami, Lee Minho, Steve Sanghyun Noh, Anna Sawai, Jimmi Simpson, and Yuh-jung Youn|}

Series with multiple nominations and awards

Special awards

John Cassavetes Award
(The award is given to the best feature made for under $1,000,000; award given to the writer, director, and producer)The Cathedral
 The African Desperate
 Holy Emy
 A Love Song
 Something in the Dirt

Robert Altman Award
(The award is given to one film's director, casting director, and ensemble cast)

 Women Talking – Sarah Polley (director), John Buchan (casting director), Jason Knight (casting director), Shayla Brown, Jessie Buckley, Claire Foy, Kira Guloien, Kate Hallett, Judith Ivey, Rooney Mara, Sheila McCarthy, Frances McDormand, Michelle McLeod, Liv McNeil, Ben Whishaw, and August WinterEmerging Filmmakers Awards

Producers Award
The award honors emerging producers who, despite highly limited resources, demonstrate the creativity, tenacity and vision required to produce quality, independent films.

 Tory Lenosky Liz Cardenas
 David Grove Churchill Viste

Someone to Watch Award
The award recognizes a talented filmmaker of singular vision who has not yet received appropriate recognition.

 Nikyatu Jusu – Nanny
 Adamma Ebo – Honk for Jesus. Save Your Soul.
 Araceli Lemos – Holy Emy

Truer than Fiction Award
The award is presented to an emerging director of non-fiction features who has not yet received significant recognition.

 Reid Davenport – I Didn't See You There
 Isabel Castro – Mija
 Rebeca Huntt – Beba

See also
 95th Academy Awards
 80th Golden Globe Awards
 76th British Academy Film Awards
 43rd Golden Raspberry Awards
 29th Screen Actors Guild Awards
 28th Critics' Choice Awards

References

External links
 
 SHOW HIGHLIGHTS | The 2023 Film Independent Spirit Awards hosted by Hasan Minhaj at Film Independent on YouTube
 OPENING MONOLOUGE - HASAN MINHAJ - 2023 FILM INDEPENDENT SPIRIT AWARDS at Film Independent on YouTube

I
2022 television awards
Independent Spirit Awards
2023 awards in the United States